Konstadinos ("Kostas") Zalagitis (born 13 December 1980) is a retired Greek triple jumper. He was born in Trikala.

He finished twelfth at the 2001 World Championships and eighth at the 2002 European Championships. He also competed at the 2000 Olympic Games and the 2005 World Championships without reaching the finals.

His personal best jump is 17.43 metres, achieved in June 2002 in Chania. In Greece only Dimitrios Tsiamis has a longer jump.

Competition record

References

1980 births
Living people
Greek male triple jumpers
Athletes (track and field) at the 2000 Summer Olympics
Olympic athletes of Greece
World Athletics Championships athletes for Greece
Sportspeople from Trikala